Eucalypteae is a large tribe of flowering plants in the family Myrtaceae; members of this tribe are known as eucalypts. In Australia the genera Angophora, Corymbia, and Eucalyptus are commonly known as gum trees, for the sticky substance that exudes from the trunk of some species. , the tribe comprised around 860 species, all native to Southeast Asia and Oceania, with a main diversity center in Australia.

Genera
There are seven genera in the tribe Eucalypteae:
Allosyncarpia  – Australia
Angophora  – Australia
Arillastrum  – New Caledonia
Corymbia  – Oceania
Eucalyptopsis  – Indonesia, New Guinea
Eucalyptus  – Southeast Asia, Oceania
Stockwellia  – Australia

References

Myrtaceae
Rosid tribes